Zastava TERVO, short for "Zastava Terenska Vozila" (English: "Zastava Terrain Vehicles"), is a Serbian automotive and defense company, specialized in the production of all-terrain vehicles. Based in Kragujevac, it was formed in 2017 with all assets of Zastava Trucks including most of its employees.

Products
Company produces terrain vehicles off all kind for military and civilian use and armoured cabins and parts for military vehicles.

Vehicles

Main product of the company is Zastava NTV designed in cooperation with Military Technical Institute. There is an armed version of the vehicle. Version for police and civilian use are also planned. 
In 2021, Yugoimport SDPR and FAP commenced a large scale production of BOV M16 Miloš in cooperation with Zastava Tervo.

Armoured cabins

In cooperation with FAP company manufactures armoured cabins for military vehicles such as cabins for PASARS-16, modernized and modular M-77 Oganj and armoured launcher for ALAS missile.

See also
 Defense industry of Serbia

References

External links

Truck manufacturers of Serbia
Companies based in Kragujevac
Government-owned companies of Serbia
Vehicle manufacturing companies established in 2017
Defense industry of Serbia
Defense companies of Serbia
Serbian brands
Serbian companies established in 2017